Adam Christian Thebesius (January 12, 1686 – November 10, 1732) was a German anatomist who was a native of Sandenwalde, Silesia.

He studied medicine in Jena, Leipzig and Leiden, receiving his doctorate from the University of Leiden in 1708.

Thebesius is known for his studies of coronary circulation. In his 1708 graduate thesis,  (from Latin: On the Circulation of the Blood in the Heart), he described the tiny cardiac venous tributaries that drain directly into the cardiac chambers. Two other anatomical structures that contain his name are:
These structures are orifices of the Thebesian veins.
 Thebesian valve: The valve of the coronary sinus.

References 

 * Biographisches Lexikon der hervorragenden Ärzte aller Zeiten und Völker, August Hirsch, W. Haberling, F. Hübotter and H. Vierordt, eds, Volume 5, second edition, Berlin 1934, p. 543.

External links
 Biography of Adam Christian Thebesius
 Adam Christian Thebesius @ Who Named It

German anatomists
1686 births
1732 deaths
People from Austrian Silesia
Leiden University alumni